Giolla Domhnaill O'Foramain was an Irish priest in the second half of the twelfth century. He was the first recorded Archdeacon of Derry.

References

Archdeacons of Derry
12th-century Irish Roman Catholic priests